An ethnic party is a political party that overtly presents itself as the champion of one ethnic group or sets of ethnic groups. Ethnic parties make such representation central to their voter mobilization strategy. An alternate designation is 'Political parties of minorities', but they should not be mistaken with regionalist or separatist parties, whose purpose is territorial autonomy.

Scientific definitions 
Ethnic party is defined here as an organization authorized to compete in local or national elections; the majority of its leadership and membership identify themselves as belonging to a nondominant ethnic group, and its electoral platform includes demands and programs of an ethnic or cultural nature.Donna Lee Van Cott, From Movements to Parties in Latin America. The Evolution of Ethnic Politics, Cambridge, Cambridge University Press, 2005  (Introduction)

An ethnic party is a party that overtly represents itself as a champion of the cause of one particular ethnic category or set of categories to the exclusion of others, and that makes such a representation central to its strategy of mobilizing voters.

Historical ethnic parties

The oldest prototypes of ethnic parties are the Jewish parties of the Russian and Austro-Hungarian empires, e.g. Bund, Folkspartei, World Agudath Israel, and the Swedish party in Finland, Svenska Folkpartiet (SFP), all of them founded in the end of the 19th century or in the first decade of the 20th.

Ethnic parties and political ideologies 

Ethnic parties may take different ideological positions.

For instance, the parties competing for Jewish votes in interwar Poland and Lithuania had a range of different political views. There were Zionist parties (themselves divided into Revisionist, General, Religious or Labour parties), there was Agudat Israel (an Orthodox religious party), the Bund (Marxist) and the Folkspartei (liberal).

In some political systems, party politics are mostly based on ethnicity, as in Bosnia-Herzegovina and its federal regions, in Israel, in Suriname, in Sabah, in Sarawak or in Guyana. In Fiji, 46 seats out of 71 are elected from ethnically-closed Communal constituencies, as there was in the pre-Israel Palestine Jewish Assembly, the Asefat ha-Nivharim with separate 'curiae' for Ashkenaz, Sepharad and Oriental, and Yemeni Jews.

As a consequence, it would be somewhat irrelevant to classify some parties in these systems as 'ideological' (social-democrat, liberal, christian democratic etc.) and some others as 'purely autonomist', 'purely ethnic' or 'purely minority' parties.

The Swedish People's Party of Finland (SFP) is a full-fledged member of the Liberal International, as well as the Movement for Rights and Freedoms, representing the Turkish minority in Bulgaria, the South Tyrol People's Party (SVP, grouping German- and Ladin-speaking inhabitants of Italy's South Tyrol province) is a member of the Christian Democratic European People's Party, whereas the Social Democratic and Labour Party (SDLP), an Irish Catholic party in Northern Ireland is a member of the Socialist International, etc.

In interwar Poland, Jewish, German and Ukrainian parties never attracted all Polish Jews, Germans and Ukrainians of whom some were members of 'national' ideological Polish parties, mostly the Socialist and Communist parties, who were considered more open-minded than the conservative or nationalist parties.

Ethnic parties and elections 
Common lists or electoral agreements can be organized either between ethnic parties (Flemish parties 'Kartel's for municipal elections in Brussels or Union des Francophones in Flemish Brabant, the coalition for the 2001 parliamentary elections in Bulgaria between the - mostly Turkish - Movement for Rights and Freedoms and the Roma party Euroroma) or between two parties having common ideological options beyond ethnic differences, as the Bund and the 'Polish' socialist party PPS for the municipal elections in 1939.

Some ethnic parties only take part in substatal electoral competition, thus making them somewhat invisible to outside observers: the South Schleswig Voter Federation in the German state of Schleswig-Holstein, the German parties in Denmark (Schleswig Party) and Poland (German Minority in Silesia), the Silesian Autonomy Movement in Poland, the Romani parties in Slovakia (Roma Civic Initiative).

It can occur that a single 'supra-ideological' party achieves, with varying shades of success, the representation of a whole ethnic group, as for the Swedish People's Party in Finland, the South Schleswig Voter Federation for Danes and Frisians in the German state of Schleswig-Holstein, the Unity for Human Rights Party for Greeks in Albania, the Slovene Union for Slovenes in north-eastern Italy, the Movement for Rights and Freedoms for Turks in Bulgaria, the Democratic Union of Hungarians in Romania.

In most cases, ethnic parties compete inside electoral systems where voters aren't compelled to vote according to ethnic affiliations and may vote too for 'non ethnic', 'transethnic' or 'supraethnic' ideological parties. In most Near Eastern Arab countries, the only such parties were the Communist parties, whose founding fathers and subsequent leaders came mostly from the Jewish, Armenian, Kurdish or Shi'ia minorities. The socialist movement in Thessaloniki (present Northern Greece) during the last decade of the Ottoman Empire was divided across ethnic lines between the Sephardi Jews (who formed the majority of the population), the Bulgarian and Macedonian Slavs and the Greeks, but all groups united when it came to election time.

'Intraethnic parties', or political parties inside diasporic communities 
There is also a specifically diasporic type of political parties that could be labelled as 'intraethnic parties', i.e. parties that compete only inside the diasporic political sphere.

The Jewish and Armenian (Dashnak, Ramgavar, or Hentchak) parties belong to this category, as well as the international sections of national parties, such as the (U.S.) Republicans Abroad and Democrats Abroad, the (French) Parti socialiste's Fédération des Français de l'étranger or the American and European branches of the Israeli Likud and of the Kuomintang (Nationalist Party of China).

There can also be specific political groupings representing members of a national community living abroad, such as the Association démocratique des Français de l'étranger - Français du Monde (left-wing) and the Union des Français de l'Etranger (right-wing), both competing for seats in the Assemblée des Français de l'étranger (fr), or the various political lists competing for the Comitati degli italiani all'estero (COMITES).

Sources

Scientific articles and papers
	Nikolaos Biziouras, "Why Ethnic Parties? Evidence from Sri Lanka, Bulgaria and Malaysia on Mobilizational Resources, Political Entrepreneurs and Selective Incentives" Paper presented at the annual meeting of the Midwest Political Science Association, Chicago, Illinois, 2005-04-07
	Kanchan Chandra, Strategic Voting for Ethnic Parties  Paper presented at the annual meeting of the American Political Science Association, Philadelphia, PA, Aug 27, 2003
	Kanchan Chandra, “Ethnic Parties and Democratic Stability.”, Perspectives on Politics.  Vol 3(2): 235-252, 2005
	Rachel Gisselquist and Kanchan Chandra, "A Cross-National Study of Ethnic Party Performance" Paper presented at the annual meeting of the International Studies Association, San Diego, California, USA, 2006-03-22
	Holley Hansen, "Identity and Institutions: Explaining Ethnic Party Success in Eastern Europe" Paper presented at the annual meeting of the International Studies Association, San Diego, California, USA, 2006-03-22
	Karleen Jones, "False Opportunity? District Magnitude and Ethnic Parties in Ecuador and Spain" Paper presented at the annual meeting of the Midwest Political Science Association, Chicago, Illinois
	Myuen Kim,. "European Integration and Ethnic Voting: Electoral Fortune of Ethnic Parties in Seven European Regions" Paper presented at the annual meeting of the Southern Political Science Association, New Orleans, LA, 2004-01-08
	Raul Madrid, "The determinants of the electoral performance of ethnic parties in Latin America: the case of the MAS in Bolivia" Paper presented at the annual meeting of the American Political Science Association, Washington, DC, 2005-09-01
	Benjamin O. Rogus, Ethnic Parties and Center-State Relations: The Case of Assam in Northeast India,  he International Relations Journal, Winter 2000-2001, Vol. XX No.1
	Maria Spirova, "Political Representation of EthnicMinorities: Electoral Institutions and Ethnic Parties in EasternEurope" Paper presented at the annual meeting of the Midwest Political Science Association, Chicago, Illinois, 2004-04-15
 Maxmilián Strmiska, "A Study on Conceptualisation of (Ethno)regional Parties", Central European Political Studies Review (Brno), Part 2-3, Volume IV, spring-summer 2002